Albert Davis was an American baseball pitcher in the Negro leagues. He played for the Detroit Stars from 1927 to 1931, along with a short stint with the Baltimore Black Sox in 1931, and the second version of the Detroit Stars in 1937.

References

External links
 and Baseball-Reference Black Baseball stats and Seamheads

Detroit Stars players
Detroit Stars (1937) players
Baltimore Black Sox players
20th-century American people
Year of birth missing
Year of death missing
Date of birth unknown
Date of death unknown
20th-century African-American people
Baseball pitchers